Mac Scorpio is a fictional character from General Hospital, an American soap opera on the ABC network. The role was originated by John J. York in February 1991. He was introduced as the brother of Robert Scorpio, and later became the guardian of Robert's daughter, Robin Scorpio, after Robert and his wife Anna Devane were presumed dead. He is the husband of Felicia Scorpio-Jones and the stepfather of Maxie and Georgie Jones.

Casting
York was hired by returning executive producer, Gloria Monty in December 1990. York made his first appearance on February 14, 1991. York had previously auditioned for two other roles on GH but was rejected. In late 1999, it was reported that York could possibly depart from the series as he was in contract negotiations. However, York renewed his contract for another year. In November 2001, York was taken off contract and began appearing on a recurring basis. In the spring of 2003, York re-signed with the series and began appearing on a contractual basis once again. York was once again dropped from contract status, in November 2014, following confirmation from the series. York crossed over to All My Children on October 8, 2001 when Mac learned his former sister-in-law Anna Devane (Finola Hughes) was alive.

Development
The character was introduced as a plot device by Monty to delve into Robert Scorpio's (Tristan Rogers) background. The character was described as "shifty" and "unreliable" who Robert holds a grudge against. Despite his brother initially hating him, Mac never becomes a villain, and he even manages to rebuild his relationship with his brother. Prior to his Port Charles arrival, Mac works as a hired hand on boating trips. York got help from Rogers on his Australian accent. However, Monty advised him to worry more about the scene than the accent which has since taken a back seat. Nancy Reichardt described Mac as being "carefree" and "mischievous." According to York, in response to Mac's sudden infatuation with Dominique Stanton (Tawny Fere Ellis), Mac has an "accessibility to love right now." York implied that this behavior stems from Mac's time as a longshoreman.

Storylines

1991–92
Mac arrived in Port Charles on Valentine's Day in 1991, on a ship owned by the Quartermaines, called the S.S. Tracy. The ship was having trouble docking into the Port Charles harbor due to engine problems as well as protesters causing a scene. When the ship caught on fire after an explosion, Mac jumped into the water. He was dragged out by Police Commissioner, Robert Scorpio, Mac's older brother. The pair came face to face after many years of estrangement. Robert was very hostile to Mac and called him a killer as well as accusing him of having something to do with the ship's engine problems. Mac's problems with Robert got worse when several attempts on Robert's life were made. Robert accused Mac of being behind the death threats. When Robert was critically wounded after someone threw a plastic explosive into his office, Mac was labeled the prime suspect. When Mac went to see his brother in I.C.U. Robert's lover, Anna knocked him down to stop him from going in Robert's room. Anna found a knife in Mac's boot and assumed he came there to do his brother harm. Mac was arrested and charged with attempted murder. He hired Scott Baldwin to represent him. It was later learned the brothers' estrangement was due to Mac and Robert's parents and Robert's fiancée, Lily, being killed in a plane crash. Mac was supposedly being careless and showing off to impress their father with his piloting skills when their plane crashed. Mac went to get help for a seriously injured Robert. Robert assumed Mac had left to save himself. Robert was rescued by someone else. Mac returned to find no trace of Robert.

Mac managed to escape from jail when an earthquake hit Port Charles. Robert found Mac trying to leave town on the next ship heading out of Port Charles. They had a fight in which Robert knocked Mac overboard. Mac was later presumed dead when no body was found. There wasn't any appearance of Mac in the water. Robert was guilt ridden, thinking he killed his brother. Later, Robert was led into a trap. He came face to face with Mac in the Finger Lakes area of New York. They eventually came to the conclusion they were set up by someone who hired Mac to come to town. Robert was shot. Mac helped him get to a community clinic for medical attention. Mac donated blood to help give Robert a needed transfusion after losing a lot of blood. They patched up their differences and explained what happened to each other when they lost their parents in the crash. Robert convinced Mac to head back to Port Charles and clear his name. Mac confessed his crimes to Robert and revealed the name of the person who had hired him. Anna managed to find the brothers after they had escaped from the county jail. The trio hid out in a mansion in Finger Lakes from the local sheriff who didn't believe Robert and Mac's story regarding the death of Rory. The woman who lived there, Dominique Taub, invited them to stay and took a shine to Mac right away. Dominique turned out to be deaf and very married. Mac still was very attracted to her and eventually hid her in Port Charles from her abusive husband.

Back in Port Charles, Mac opened a new club called the Outback. Dominique's childhood nanny, who had only recently arrived, was murdered opening night. Dom was charged with her nanny's murder and her husband managed to obtain legal guardianship of her. Mac got beat up trying to help Dom escape. Dom's husband carted her off to make an heir. Dom escaped back to PC only to be hit by a car and found once again by her husband. Mac helped her stage her suicide and made plans to flee the country with her. While in hiding, Dom refused to make love with Mac due to flashbacks of the abuse she suffered at the hands of her husband. Caught once again, Dom was put into a sanitarium where Mac secretly visited her. Her therapist informed them Dom would need much therapy before she would be capable of a real relationship with Mac. While Dom worked on getting better, Mac helped Robert and Anna in their fight against the Cartel. Mac, Robert, Anna, and Bill finally defeated the Cartel and the members were sent to prison. Dominique was finally free to be with Mac after her husband, a member of the Cartel, was killed while escaping from prison. Mac taught her a man can be gentle and kind. They fell in love. Mac's relationship with Dominique became strained later, however, when Mac was informed his brother Robert was killed in a boat explosion after trying to save Anna. Mac had agreed to take care of his niece, Robin when Robert had left to find Anna. Now Mac was Robin's guardian. All his time with her didn't allow him to focus on Dominique very much. Mac broke up with Dominique when he realized he couldn't love her the way she wanted him to.

Mac found himself using his skills as a P.I. when Felicia Jones returned to town under mysterious circumstances suffering from amnesia. He hired her as a bartender at the Outback and helped her unravel the mystery behind her nightmares of witnessing a murder. Mac admitted to having feelings for Felicia. They started dating. When Felicia remembered she had seen Ryan Chamberlain kill a woman in Texas, she stabbed Ryan in a struggle. Mac found her standing over his unconscious body. Felicia was charged with attempted murder and sentenced to a term in a mental hospital. Mac rescued her. They went on the run from the law. They began digging into Ryan's past and faked Felicia's death to throw Ryan off their trail. After discovering Ryan had committed several murders, they tried to get Ryan to confess to them on tape. Eventually Ryan was apprehended and convicted of murder.

Mac and Felicia became closer than ever and tried to fight off their attraction to no avail. They agreed to go slowly and date. Mac fell in love with her and asked her to marry him in the middle of trying to catch an escaped Ryan. She said no at first due to her failed relationship with Frisco. After nearly being killed by Ryan, Felicia realized she loved Mac and proposed to him. He said yes. They celebrated by making love for the first time. While they planned their wedding, they became partners in a private investigation business. Their wedding was ruined when Ryan escaped from the mental hospital and assumed his twin brother Kevin's identity. He went to the church with a bomb. Mac struggled with him to get it away from him. Mac was injured. They had to postpone their wedding. However, their wedding never happened. Felicia's young daughter Maxie was very sick and needed a heart transplant. Mac found Maxie's father Frisco in Africa and convinced him to return to PC in case his daughter died. Mac saw Felicia still had unresolved feelings for Frisco. Mac broke up with her but the two remained best friends. Mac was upset when Felicia informed him she was pregnant with Frisco's baby. However, Mac accepted Georgie instantly and loved both her daughters like a father. Mac became romantically involved with Katherine Bell, who was very different from Mac in many ways. They nearly broke up months later when Lucy informed Mac and Damian that Katherine had been seeing both of them. Lucy was retaliating for Kevin and Mac dressing in drag in order to prove Madame Maia, Lucy's psychic, was a fake. Katherine sweet-talked Mac into giving her another chance.

1993–98
Mac and Robin began butting heads over her new flame, Stone Cates. Mac wasn't pleased Stone lived with local mobster Sonny Corinthos. After Robin gloated to Mac about sleeping with Stone despite his attempts to prevent it, Felicia suggested Robin should go on the Pill. Robin slept with Stone without using a condom. When Stone complained of severe headaches and a cold that wouldn't go away, Kevin ordered blood tests. The tests revealed Stone was HIV positive. Stone couldn't bring himself to tell Robin until he got shot and she attempted to help him. At the hospital, Alan persuaded Robin to be tested as well. She was negative. Alan also told Stone he had advanced AIDS and started him on drug therapy immediately. Afraid of infecting her, Stone refused to sleep with Robin anymore. When Robin finally told Mac that Stone had AIDS and they had unprotected sex, Mac was very angry and scared. He eventually warmed up to Stone. When Mac threw Robin a surprise party, the guests presented Stone with the memory book she had initiated. In the book were several letters written by Stone's friends, including a touching one from Mac. As Stone's health failed, Alan discovered he had lymphoma. Stone chose to forego treatment and his friends rallied around him during his last few weeks of life. Near the end, Stone made Robin get tested again. This time the test revealed Robin to be HIV positive. Mac was very loving and supportive of her. Stone was devastated and screamed out in frustration. Mac and Sonny took turns watching over the ailing couple. Stone quietly died within a few days. His memorial service was held at Sonny's penthouse. At the annual Nurses' Ball, Mac had an AIDS Memorial Quilt made in Stone's memory.

Mac used Katherine as an informant against Damian and later helped to clear her of Damian's murder. Convinced Damian was alive, Mac, Luke, and Kevin headed to Texas to find him. Damian was killed in the fire at the Ward House. Katherine was not happy when Mac began spending more time with Felicia in the aftermath of Felicia's stalking by Kevin. Things got worse between the pair when Jax's first wife Miranda showed up in town. Miranda and Mac had lived together in Australia. Working for the Jacks family, Mac had set off an explosion and thought she had died in it. Mac proposed to Katherine but she turned him down. Felicia comforted Mac as a friend. They grew close as they went through several different adventures.

Mac had a hard time accepting Robin's next boyfriend, Jason Morgan. Jason also worked for Sonny Corinthos. Robin eventually went away to school. Mac became the Police Commissioner after seeing police corruption get out of hand. He also found himself involved in a case with his best friend, Felicia. Felicia took on a case of a woman named Tess who hired her to find her missing husband, who left her years ago. Felicia noticed the man looked identical to Mac in the picture Tess showed her. Mac was later kidnapped by Tess but managed to escape and find out what Tess' plan was for him. He was being set up to take the fall for the assassination of his old foe, Jasper Jacks. Tess was apprehended. Mac and Felicia, however, had their own predicament. Felicia had accepted a marriage proposal from the fake Mac, James Meadows. All of their friends were so happy for them. They couldn't tell them the engagement was a lie. They eventually found themselves in love with each other after having to pretend they were engaged. Mac professed his love to Felicia at the altar of their double wedding with Lucy and Kevin. They had planned on calling off their wedding and telling their friends the truth. Instead, Lucy and Kevin called off their wedding. Mac and Felicia got hitched. Felicia shared the whole story involving Tess, James, and the fake engagement with the congregation before exchanging vows from the heart with Mac. They celebrated with their family and then flew off to Paris for their honeymoon.

1998–2002
Their marriage was happy for the first year or so. Mac was wounded in a shoot-out at the Outback but later recovered. Felicia began writing Lila Quartermaine's memoirs and enlisted Luke Spencer, who was grieving over his son's death, to help her. Mac trusted Felicia when she was working with Luke on her book. After he rescued them from being locked together in a crypt, he warned Luke to stay away from his wife. However, Felicia continued to work with Luke and lied to Mac about it.

Mac also had to deal with the return of his brother's enemy, Cesar Faison, who was very much alive after all. Cesar wanted revenge on Mac. After months of taunting Mac by approaching his loved ones, Faison kidnapped Felicia. Both Luke and Mac went looking for her. Luke managed to find her first, but ended up becoming a captive as well. Trapped together, Felicia and Luke nearly made love but stopped before anything actually happened. However, they didn't realize Faison had taped their encounter. Mac soon rescued them. The duo remained mum about what had nearly happened. Faison later sent the tape to Mac at Christmas time in 1999. Mac was devastated by the video. He eventually confronted Felicia with the video and left her. He forgave her. The two agreed to try to save their marriage.

Mac took another blow when Felicia went back on her promise to stay away from Luke and left town to help him find his son. Mac was fed up and filed divorce papers as well as custody papers for custody of Maxie and Georgie. He later dropped the custody battle and proceeded with just the divorce. Mac found himself also letting his bias interfere with his job. He railroaded Luke into a murder charge knowing the evidence was very circumstantial at best. Mac also missed Felicia terribly while she went on vacation with her girls. He agreed to give their marriage a chance after all when Felicia told him she loved him still. However, it didn't last. Felicia took the stand when it looked like Luke could be found guilty of murdering Stefan. Felicia testified she was in a motel with Luke and made love to him the night of Stefan's "murder." Mac was devastated. He was also humiliated when Stefan showed up alive and well in PC. Mac resigned as Police Commissioner and went back to private investigating.

After realizing he still loved Felicia, he vowed to her he would win her back from Luke. He soon realized she was in love with Luke by then. Felicia tried to have a deeper relationship with Luke. Luke was too wrapped up in other things to notice. Heartbroken, Felicia took the girls to Texas with her for a while. Mac found himself returning to his police commissioner job again in the midst of the investigation into Sorel's murder. There were several suspects in the murder of Joseph Sorel, several of whom stepped forward to try to implicate someone else. As the case developed several twists and turns, Mac asked Felicia to help him figure out the identity of the murderer. After gathering all the suspects in an old mansion and eliminating them one by one, Mac and Felicia figured out that Sorel's daughter Angel had killed Sorel. They went to arrest her at her lake house. Jax, Sonny, Carly, and Angel had arranged for Carly and Angel to switch places to fool the cops. By the time Mac got to the house, Jax had already gotten Angel onto a plane headed out of the country.

As the Spencer/Cassadine war came to a boiling point, Gia tried to get Mac to arrest Stavros/Lucien Cane. He refused since she had recently cried wolf on several occasions. When Helena and Stavros were finally defeated in her underground lab, Mac was right there to arrest Helena. To everyone's dismay, Mac wasn't able to find any physical evidence of Helena's latest evil actions, including bringing Stavros back to life. When Helena doubled over in pain in her cell during a visit from Luke, Mac tried to convince him she really was sick and was scheduled for surgery. He warned Luke to stay away from her. Helena later escaped. Mac butted heads with Luke on how to handle looking for her. Luke caught Helena and brought her back to the cops. Mac even allowed Luke to accompany Helena to the prison van to make sure she didn't escape again.

Mac tried to look out for Felicia by warning her against a relationship with Roy DiLucca, who had recently made moves towards becoming a mobster. She asked Mac to help her trace a briefcase full of cash which had shown up in Roy's apartment. She also told Mac she could handle things with Roy.

As Luke and Laura prepared for their upcoming wedding, Laura began having flashbacks of a night long ago in the garage attic of her childhood home, which belonged to the Scorpios now. When a fire broke out in the garage attic while Maxie was watching Lulu, Mac yelled at Maxie for putting Lulu in danger. He discovered the fire had been deliberately set. Luke wanted Mac to ask Scott what he knew about it. Luke claimed Scott had been acting weird and wondered why Scott had been the first on the scene. Mac had no evidence to validate Luke's suspicions. Luke continued to look into the incident of long ago. When Rick Webber, Laura's stepfather, turned up dead due to a drunk-driving accident, Mac and Scott knew right away it was a set up. Although they believed Lucky and Nikolas were responsible for moving the body, they thought Luke had actually killed Rick in the attic. When Luke and Laura returned to the attic a few weeks later, Mac arrested Luke. Scott had Laura admitted to the hospital for mental evaluation.

2002–04
Mac had a murder to investigate when Luis Alcazar was thrown from his hotel balcony. Alcazar, an international arms dealer, had come to town a few months earlier with Brenda, who hadn't perished in the car crash years earlier. Alcazar wanted to eliminate Brenda's past loves, Sonny and Jax, so he could have her for himself. She refused to be with him and resumed a relationship with Jax. After crashing her surprise party at the Quartermaines, Alcazar had left before Mac arrested him for trespassing and was later killed. Mac arrested Jason after AJ claimed to have seen Jason driving Alcazar's limo that night. Skye claimed to have seen Brenda actually push Alcazar off the balcony. As Mac took Skye's statement about seeing Brenda kill Alcazar, he realized she was drunk at the time and wanted to get back at Brenda for stealing Jax away from her. Scott was also desperate to pin the murder on any associate of Sonny's. He planted a bug in the interrogation room. Mac found it and took it out. Mac then told Scott he wouldn't tolerate Scott's illegal antics in solving Alcazar's murder. Mac tried to help solve the case by re-enacting the events of that evening to get Brenda to remember more and to disprove Jax's recent confession. No new leads emerged. Mac went to arrest Brenda at the Quartermaine holiday party. Brenda and Jax eluded Mac when the lights went out. The Quartermaines refused to point him in the right direction. Felicia later persuaded Mac to give her the location of the witness Scott had found who stated she had seen Brenda kill Alcazar. Since Mac believed in Brenda's innocence, he agreed to help Felicia, who was working to clear Brenda and Jason of the murder. Brenda and Jason were later cleared by the real killer, who turned out to be Alexis Davis.

When Felicia went to Texas to take care of her ailing grandmother Maria, Mac became the primary parent in Maxie and Georgie's lives. Mac had his hands full with Maxie. She acted the typical part of rebellious teenager by going to parties and drinking. Mac managed to break up the party Maxie tried to throw at their house and announced he was moving in to keep a better eye on them. When Maxie went to a party and slept with Kyle, one of the popular guys at school, she didn't realize their encounter was being broadcast over the Internet. Mac found out about it when he was investigating a tip about a porn site featuring PC high school kids. He saw red when he realized he was watching Maxie. When Mac confronted Maxie and demanded to know who the boy in the film was, she wouldn't tell him. After Maxie nearly died of a drug overdose, Mac blamed Jason and Sonny for the recent influx of drugs in Port Charles. After Jason convinced him they weren't responsible, Mac told Jason he'd be willing to look the other way if Jason wanted to kill the responsible party.

Soon Georgie was giving Mac headaches as well by dating Dillon Quartermaine. Fed up with the lack of warmth from his family, Dillon wanted to run away and convinced Georgie to join him. When Mac found out Georgie was gone, he tracked the pair to a motel and barged in the room to find them kissing. Livid, Mac arrested Dillon but later released him. However, he warned the pair to stay away from each other. After Dillon found himself stuck with his job for mobster Lorenzo Alcazar, Georgie convinced him to tell all to Mac in an attempt to prove his worthiness to date Georgie. Instead, Mac told Dillon his recent partnership with Alcazar was a good reason for him to stay away from Georgie. When he caught Dillon the next morning in Georgie's room, he threw him out and then attempted to warn Georgie of the dangers of having sex. She assured him she wasn't sleeping with Dillon. When Georgie rented a room a few weeks later at the Port Charles Hotel in order to have a romantic evening of love making with Dillon, Mac interrupted and had a heart to heart with Georgie. He told her he only wanted what was best for her. Shaken by Mac's loving words, Georgie postponed her night of passion with Dillon.

While dealing with his kids, Mac silently kept the criminal element in line in Port Charles. He investigated Carly's kidnapping by Ric Lansing and then Ric's disappearance. When a raid on a drug shipment went sour, a shootout between the cops and the mob ensued. One of the cops was shot. Faith later named Zander as the shooter. Desperate, Zander went on the run. Mac didn't realize Maxie was hiding Zander in her room. Maxie managed to get Zander to the basement of the PC Hotel and promised to get the cash he needed to flee the country. However, Nikolas found Zander first, knocked him out, and called the cops to come arrest him. Mac went to arrest Zander with another officer. Unaware a fire had broken out in the electrical room where Zander was hiding, Mac opened the door. He was caught in a back draft and suffered severe burns. When Maxie found out what had happened to Mac, she went to his bedside to be with him and confessed she had been hiding Zander. When Georgie was finally rescued from the fire and arrived at the hospital, Maxie tearfully informed her of Mac's condition. Dillon supported Georgie as she went to see a badly burned Mac. The sisters continued to worry as Mac's condition seemed to worsen. Tracy Quartermaine kept lurking around, spouting false sympathies in the hopes the girls wouldn't hold the Quartermaines, who owned the hotel, responsible for Mac's condition. Georgie finally told Tracy off.

Felicia returned while Mac was hospitalized to resume her role of mother. She supported her daughters in their grief over Mac and sat by Mac's beside. She urged him to get better. Felicia learned Mac had disappeared from the hospital. She found him at Mercy Hospital labeled with a John Doe name tag. She vowed to unravel the mystery of his transfer. When Mac awoke, he asked Felicia to just let this mystery go and focus on her family. But Felicia still wondered what had happened.

2005–present

In the summer of 2008, York appeared on the spin-off General Hospital: Night Shift, when Mac's brother Robert Scorpio was battling colon cancer. York took the opportunity to speak out about the issue and raise awareness. He felt especially close to the topic due to his own experience with ulcerative colitis. York spent time speaking to groups about his own experience as well as preventative measures.

Reception
By the summer of 1991, York had become one of the top stars in daytime TV.

References

General Hospital characters
General Hospital: Night Shift characters
Fictional police commissioners
Television characters introduced in 1991
Male characters in television
Crossover characters in television